Varatchaya "Pias" Wongteanchai (born 7 September 1989) is a former professional tennis player from Thailand.

In her career, she won two doubles titles on the WTA Tour, as well as four singles titles and 31 doubles titles on the ITF Women's Circuit. On 20 July 2015, she reached her highest singles ranking of world No. 200. On 12 September 2016, she peaked at No. 77 in the doubles rankings.

Playing for Thailand Fed Cup team, Wongteanchai has accumulated a win–loss record of 10–6.

Her younger sister Varunya Wongteanchai is also a tennis professional.

Career
In February 2012, Wongteanchai made her WTA Tour main-draw debut at her home tournament, the Pattaya Open. She qualified for the main draw by defeating Hsu Wen-hsin in three, and Misa Eguchi in straight sets. She then faced top-seed Vera Zvonareva in the first round but lost in two sets by 2–6, 5–7. She also partnered her younger sister Varunya in the doubles event, but they lost in the quarterfinals.

In 2013, Wongteanchai started her year by winning a title at the Blossom Cup. It was her most important title so far. She was then awarded a wildcard into the Pattaya Open, where she defeated Annika Beck 6–3, 6–3 but lost to Marina Erakovic in the second round. In the doubles event, Wongteanchai partnered with her sister Varunya. In the first round, they defeated the third seeds Chan Yung-jan and Chan Hao-ching as well as Irina Buryachok and Valeria Solovyeva. They then lost to Akgul Amanmuradova and Alexandra Panova in the semifinals. She also played in the qualifying event of the 2013 Roland Garros but lost to Grace Min in the first round.

WTA career finals

Doubles: 2 (2 titles)

WTA 125 tournament finals

Doubles: 1 (runner–up)

ITF finals

Singles: 7 (4–3)

Doubles: 61 (31–30)

References

External links
 
 
 

1989 births
Living people
Varatchaya Wongteanchai
Varatchaya Wongteanchai
Asian Games medalists in tennis
Tennis players at the 2010 Asian Games
Tennis players at the 2014 Asian Games
Varatchaya Wongteanchai
Medalists at the 2010 Asian Games
Universiade medalists in tennis
Varatchaya Wongteanchai
Varatchaya Wongteanchai
Southeast Asian Games medalists in tennis
Competitors at the 2009 Southeast Asian Games
Universiade gold medalists for Thailand
Universiade silver medalists for Thailand
Universiade bronze medalists for Thailand
Medalists at the 2011 Summer Universiade
Medalists at the 2013 Summer Universiade
Medalists at the 2015 Summer Universiade
Medalists at the 2017 Summer Universiade
Varatchaya Wongteanchai